Jan Fields is an American business executive, public speaker and advocate for women's career development. She was the president of McDonald's USA. She was recognized by Forbes Magazine in 2012 as one of the most powerful women in business.

Career 
Fields started her career as a crew member at a McDonald's restaurant in 1978, and worked her way up the organization through the management chain. She served as president and senior vice president of McDonald’s Central Division, senior vice president in the former Southeast Division and regional vice president of the Pittsburgh region. In 2006, she was appointed Executive Vice President and Chief Operating Officer of McDonald's USA. She was appointed President of McDonald's USA in 2010, where she was responsible for the strategic direction and overall business results of the 14,000 McDonald's restaurants throughout the United States.

After 34 years with the company, Fields left McDonald's on December 1, 2012. Fields serves on the boards of Chico's FAS Inc., Taubman Centers Inc., Welbilt Inc., and Ronald McDonald House Charities. She previously served on the board of Monsanto. She is also a member of Women Corporate Directors. Previously she served on the board of The Field Museum, the advisory board of Catalyst, a leading women’s organization, and chaired the board of United Cerebral Palsy.

References 

Living people
McDonald's people
Year of birth missing (living people)
Women business executives